The 2002–03 Macedonian Second Football League was the eleventh season since its establishment. It began on 10 August 2002 and ended on 7 June 2003.

Participating teams

League standing

Results

See also
2002–03 Macedonian Football Cup
2002–03 Macedonian First Football League

References

External links
Macedonia - List of final tables (RSSSF)
Football Federation of Macedonia 
MacedonianFootball.com 

Macedonia 2
2
Macedonian Second Football League seasons